Eurwyn Wiliam  is a Welsh curator and author who was Chairman of the Royal Commission on the Ancient and Historical Monuments of Wales (2009–19) and Assistant Keeper of the National Museum Wales.

Career 
A native of the Lleyn Peninsula, Wiliam studied for the postgraduate degrees of Master of Arts (MA) and Doctor of Philosophy (PhD) at the University of Wales. He was Assistant Keeper and later Director of Collections and Research and Deputy Director-General of the National Museum Wales.

Wiliam was appointed as a commissioner of the Royal Commission on the Ancient and Historical Monuments of Wales in 1992 and later succeeded Ralph A. Griffiths as chair in 2009 retiring in 2019. He was involved in establishing the register to protect Welsh placenames.

He is also chair of the Nantgarw China Works (Pottery) Trust. He has also been Chairman of the University of Wales Alumni Association. He was elected President of the Cambrian Archaeological Association in 2021.

An authority on the buildings of Wales and Welsh vernacular architecture, he has published several books on the subject.

Wiliam was elected a Fellow of the Society of Antiquaries in 1988.

Select Bibliography

References

Living people
Alumni of the University of Wales
British curators
20th-century Welsh historians
21st-century Welsh historians
Year of birth missing (living people)